Heather Singleton is a Zimbabwean international lawn bowler.

Bowls career
Singleton was selected as part of the five woman team by Zimbabwe for the 2020 World Outdoor Bowls Championship

She won a fours bronze medal (with Allyson Dale, Melanie James and Kerry Craven), at the 2019 Atlantic Bowls Championships.

References

Zimbabwean female bowls players
Living people
Year of birth missing (living people)